Uncial 0237 (in the Gregory-Aland numbering), ε 014 (von Soden), is a Greek-Coptic uncial manuscript of the New Testament. Paleographically it has been assigned to the 6th-century.

Description 
The codex contains two small parts of the Gospel of Matthew 15:12-15,17-19, on one parchment leaf (23 cm by 18 cm). The text is written in two columns per page, 23 lines per page, in uncial letters.

It is a palimpsest.

Currently it is dated by the INTF to the 6th-century.

Text 
The Greek text of this codex is mixed. Aland placed it in Category III.

History 

Probably it was found in Fayyum.

The manuscript was examined by Karl Wessely, who published its text. It was added to the list of New Testament manuscripts by C. R. Gregory, who classified it as lectionary 349.

The manuscript was added to the list of the New Testament manuscripts by Kurt Aland in 1954.

It was digitised by the INTF.

Currently the codex is housed at the Austrian National Library (Pap. K. 8023) in Vienna.

Salso27 
0237
 List of New Testament uncials
 Coptic versions of the Bible
 Textual criticism

References

Further reading 

 
 Stanley E. Porter, New Testament Greek Papyri and Parchments, Vienna 2008, pp. 88–91.

External links 
  – digitalized manuscript

Greek New Testament uncials
6th-century biblical manuscripts
Greek-Coptic diglot manuscripts of the New Testament
Biblical manuscripts of the Austrian National Library